The .360 No 2 Nitro Express is a centerfire rifle cartridge developed by Eley Brothers and introduced in 1905.

Design
The .360 No 2 Nitro Express is a rimmed, bottlenecked cartridge designed for use in single shot and double rifles.

As is common with cartridges for double rifles, due to the need to regulate the two barrels to the same point of aim, the .360 No 2 Nitro Express was offered in only one loading. This cartridge is noted for the extremely low chamber pressures it generates due to its cartridge capacity, the lowest of any cartridge in its class.

History
Eley created the .360 No 2 Nitro Express by necking down the .400 Jeffery Nitro Express and adding a more rounded shoulder. Introduced in 1905, some writers have stated this cartridge never achieved the popularity it deserved because of the arrival of the .375 H&H Magnum seven years later.

.360 No 2 Nitro Express cartridges can still be sourced today by manufacturers such as Kynoch, whilst reloaders can reform cartridges from .400 Jeffery Nitro Express cartridges.

Use
The .360 No 2 Nitro Express is considered suitable for use for hunting all thin-skinned African or Indian game.

In his African Rifles and Cartridges, John "Pondoro" Taylor described the .360 No 2 Nitro Express as a splendid cartridge, stating it was "ideally suited for use in doubles and single-loaders".

See also
 Nitro Express
 List of rifle cartridges
 9 mm rifle cartridges

References

External links
 Ammo-One, "360 No. 2 Nitro Express", ammo-one.com, retrieved 29 April 2017.
 Cartridgecollector, "360 No. 2 Nitro Express 3 inch", cartridgecollector.net, retrieved 29 April 2017.
 Municion, ".360 No. 2 Nitro Express 3 inch", municion.org , retrieved 29 April 2017.

Pistol and rifle cartridges
British firearm cartridges
Eley Brothers cartridges